Alicia Fabbri (born February 16, 2003) is a Canadian ice dancer. With her skating partner, Paul Ayer, she is the 2019 Canadian national junior silver medalist and the 2019 Bavarian Open junior silver medalist. They placed in the top nine at the 2019 World Junior Championships.

Personal life
Fabbri was born on February 16, 2003, in Laval, Quebec. Outside of skating, she enjoys boating and being outdoors. Her favorite subject in school is mathematics.

Career

Early career
Fabbri began competing with Claudio Pietrantonio in the 2014–15 season. Together, they were the 2016 Canadian national novice silver medalists. They were coached by Julien Lalonde, Mylène Girard, and Lynn McKay in La Prairie, Quebec and Saint-Hubert, Quebec.

2016–2017 season: Junior debut
Fabbri/Pietrantonio opened their season with a fourth-place finish at the 2016 Lake Placid Ice Dance International. They were assigned to their first Junior Grand Prix events. Fabbri/Pietrantonio placed fourth at 2016 JGP Russia in Saransk and sixth at 2016 JGP Germany in Dresden.

They placed seventh at the 2017 Canadian Championships.

2017–2018 season: First JGP medal
Fabbri/Pietrantonio placed fifth at 2017 JGP Latvia for their first international event of the season. They won their first international medal, a bronze, at 2017 JGP Italy.

They placed seventh at the 2018 Canadian Championships for the second consecutive year. Fabbri/Pietrantonio split following the competition. Fabbri teamed up with Paul Ayer in April.

2018–2019 season: New partnership
Fabbri/Ayer were assigned to two Junior Grand Prix events in their first season together. They placed fourth at 2018 JGP Slovakia and seventh at 2018 JGP Slovenia.

Fabbri/Ayer placed second at the 2019 Canadian Championships behind Marjorie Lajoie / Zachary Lagha. Together, they were named to the Canadian team for the 2019 World Junior Championships in Zagreb, Croatia. At a tune-up event, the 2019 Bavarian Open, Fabbri/Ayer again won silver behind Lajoie/Lagha.

Fabbri/Ayer were thirteenth after the rhythm dance segment at the 2019 World Junior Championships but rallied with an eighth-place showing in the free dance to place ninth overall. Combined with Lajoie/Lagha's placement (first place), their rank qualified three ice dance spots for Canada at the 2020 World Junior Championships in Tallinn, Estonia.

2019–2020 season: New coaches
In July 2019, Fabbri/Ayer left coach Julien Lalonde to train with Marie-France Dubreuil, Patrice Lauzon, and Romain Haguenauer in Montreal. They made their senior international debut at the 2019 CS Warsaw Cup, where they placed sixth with personal bests in all segments.

2020–2021 season 
Fabbri/Ayer were assigned to make their Grand Prix debut at the 2020 Skate Canada International, but the event was cancelled as a result of the coronavirus pandemic.

With the pandemic continuing to make it difficult to hold in-person events, Fabbri/Ayer competed at virtual domestic competitions, placing fifth at the 2021 Skate Canada Challenge.  This result would have qualified them for the 2021 Canadian Championships, but they were cancelled due to the pandemic.

2021–2022 season 
Fabbri/Ayer returned to international competition after almost two years at the 2021 CS Lombardia Trophy, placing twelfth. Given a second Challenger assignment, they were fifth at the 2021 CS Cup of Austria.

At the 2022 Canadian Championships, held in a bubble in Ottawa due to Omicron variant restrictions, Fabbri/Ayer finished in seventh place overall after being hampered by a fall in the closing seconds of their rhythm dance.

2022–2023 season 
Skate Canada named Fabbri and Ayer to the senior national team for the first time in the lead-up to the new season. They ventured out internationally for the first time at the 2022 CS Budapest Trophy, where they finished in fourth place, 11.60 points behind bronze medalists Wolfkostin/Chen of the United States. Ayer assessed that they had given a "really strong performance in the rhythm dance and connected with the crowd," though faulting themselves for a free dance error. They were then invited to finally make the Grand Prix debut and came eighth at the 2022 MK John Wilson Trophy. Ayer dislocated his shoulder in the practice sessions at the Wilson Trophy and, while they were able to finish the event by making modifications to their program, it was subsequently determined that he required surgery. As a result, they withdrew from the 2023 Canadian Championships.

Programs

With Ayer

With Pietrantonio

Competitive highlights
GP: Grand Prix; CS: Challenger Series; JGP: Junior Grand Prix

With Ayer

With Pietrantonio

Detailed results
ISU personal bests highlighted in bold.  Small medals for rhythm and free dances awarded at ISU Championships only.

With Ayer

Senior results

Junior results

With Pietrantonio

References

External links 

 
 

2003 births
Canadian female ice dancers
Living people
Sportspeople from Laval, Quebec
21st-century Canadian women